Christophe Beaucarne, SBC is a Belgian cinematographer. He is the son of the poet Julos Beaucarne.

He is a member of Association Française des directeurs de la photographie Cinématographique (AFC). He received the Magritte Award for Best Cinematography for his work in the 2009 film Mr. Nobody. He was nominated for five César Awards for Best Cinematography for Anne Fontaine's Coco Before Chanel (2009), Mathieu Amalric's On Tour (2010), Christophe Gans's Beauty and the Beast (2014), Nicole Garcia's From the Land of the Moon (2016) and Mathieu Amalric's Barbara (2017).

Filmography

References

External links

Living people
Belgian cinematographers
Magritte Award winners
1965 births